, known by the pen names  and , was a Japanese author, manga writer, and film producer. He is known for the work about sports and martial arts, with images of heroic young men with the occasional fine details as he moves from one topic to another. He considered Tiger Mask and Star of the Giants to be his life's work.

Biography
The son of an illustrator and editor, Takamori was a notorious juvenile delinquent with an interest on fighting. After World War II, his family moved to Tokyo, where he jumped schools until landing a job as a novelist at 17. He adopted the pen names Ikki Kajiwara and Asao Takamori, since he was writing for a rival magazine at the time.
He was married to Pai Bing-bing and fathered a daughter, Pai Hsiao-yen, who was kidnapped, tortured, and murdered in 1997.

Works

Manga 
All listings are as Ikki Kajiwara unless otherwise specified.

 Ai to Makoto (art: Takumi Nagayasu)
 Asahi no Koibito (as Asao Takamori, art: Eiji Kazama)
 Ashita no Joe (art: Tetsuya Chiba)
 Akaki Chi no Eleven (art:Mitsuyoshi Sonoda)
 Champion Futoshi (art: Tatsuo Yoshida)
 Jūdō Icchokusen (art: Shinji Nagashima)
 Karate Baka Ichidai (art: Jirō Tsunoda and Jōya Kagemaru)
 Karate Jigokuhen (art: Ken Nakajō)
 Kick no Oni (art: Ken Nakajō)
 Kurenai no Chōsensha (as Asao Takamori, art: Ken Nakajō)
 Kyojin no Hoshi (art: Noboru Kawasaki)
 Ningen Kyōki (art: Yasuo Nakano)
 Otoko Michi (art: Takao Yaguchi)
 Otoko no Jōken (art: Noboru Kawasaki)
 Otoko no Seiza (art: Kunichika Harada)
 Pro Wrestling Superstar Retsuden (art: Kunichika Harada)
 Samurai Giants (art: Kō Inoue)
 Shikakui Jungle (as Asao Takamori, art: Ken Nakajō)
 Shin Karate Jigokuhen (art: Ken Nakajō)
 Tiger Mask (art: Naoki Tsuji)
 Tiger Mask 2nd (art: Junichi Miyata)
 Yuuyake Banchō (art: Toshio Shōji)

Movies 

 Ai no nagisa（1976）
 Chijou saikyou no karate（1976年）:documentary
 Chijou saikyou no karate PART2（1976）:documentary
 Ame no meguri ai（1977）
 Hishuu monogatari（1977）（director：Seijun Suzuki、plot：Atsushi Yamatoya）
 Seiki no shinken shoubu Shijou saikyou no karate kessyuu hen（1977） :documentary
 Mach'78（1978）
 Karate dai sensou（1978）
 Kakutougi sekai ichi Shikakui jungle（1978） :documentary
 Gekitotsu! Kakutougi Shikakui jungle（1979）:documentary
 Saikyou Saigo no karate（1980） :documentary
 Ashita no Joe（1980）
 Kakutougi Olympic（1980）:documentary
 Little Champion（1981）
 Ashita no Joe 2 （1981）
 Star of the Giants（1982）
 Modorigawa（1983）（director：Tatsumi Kumashiro, plot：Haruhiko Arai、original story：Mikihiko Renjō「Modorigawa Shinjuu」）

References 

 Bakuman manga by Tsugumi Ohba, chapter 5, page 16–17. It is mentioned there that, by the time he was working on Ashita no Joe, Kajiwara was working in five series at the same time (Joe included).

External links 
 
  CinemaScape
  Japan Movie Database

 
1936 births
1987 deaths
Japanese film producers
Japanese writers
Manga writers
Gekiga creators
Writers from Kumamoto Prefecture